The Secret Life of an American Wife is a 1968 comedy film written and directed by George Axelrod. The film was released by 20th Century Fox in 1968, and was considered a box-office failure.  It features a music score by Billy May.  Edy Williams has a supporting role in the film as the Laytons' blonde bombshell neighbor.

Plot
Victoria Layton (Anne Jackson) is a suburban housewife who is dissatisfied with her marriage and fears that her sex appeal is fading.  Her husband (Patrick O'Neal) works as a press agent, and his only client is a movie star who is known as an international sex symbol (Walter Matthau).

Upon hearing that The Movie Star (the character is not given a name, and Matthau is credited as "The Movie Star" in the closing credits) indulges in the services of prostitutes, Victoria decides to pose surreptitiously as one in order to prove to herself that she is still sexually attractive.

Cast
 Walter Matthau as The Movie Star
 Anne Jackson as Victoria Layton
 Patrick O'Neal as Tom Layton
 Edy Williams as Susie Steinberg
 Richard Bull as Howard
 Paul Napier as Herb Steinberg
 Gary Brown as Jimmy
 Albert Carrier as Jean-Claude

Reception
According to Fox records, the film required $4,300,000 in rentals to break even and by 11 December 1970 had made $3,725,000, net a loss to the studio.

References

External links
 
 

1968 films
1960s sex comedy films
20th Century Fox films
Adultery in films
American sex comedy films
1960s English-language films
Films directed by George Axelrod
Films scored by Billy May
Films set in Connecticut
Films set in New York City
Films shot in Connecticut
Films shot in New York City
Films with screenplays by George Axelrod
1968 comedy films
1960s American films